The 1993 Recopa Sudamericana was the fifth Recopa Sudamericana, an annual football match between the winners of the previous season's Copa Libertadores and Supercopa Sudamericana competitions. This year's edition became the first final to be disputed between two clubs from the same nation and the second in South American club competitions. Due to schedule congestion, the first leg was played as part of the Campeonato Brasileiro.

The series was contested between São Paulo, winners of the 1992 Copa Libertadores, and Cruzeiro, winners of the 1992 Supercopa Sudamericana, in a two-legged series. Coached by the illustrious Telê Santana, São Paulo came away with the title after defeating Cruzeiro, appearing in their second consecutive final, 4–2 on penalties after a 0–0 tie to obtain the trophy for the first time. This became the 4th international title for São Paulo's golden generation. The series became notable as the legendary Ronaldo competed in an international competition for the first time ever only to fail to score during the penalty shoot-out.

Qualified teams

Venues

Match details

First leg

Second leg

References 

Rec
Recopa Sudamericana
R
R
R
R